Adem Čejvan (2 March 1927 – 5 November 1989) was a Bosnian actor.

Filmography

External links

1927 births
1989 deaths
People from Banja Luka
Bosniaks of Bosnia and Herzegovina
Bosnia and Herzegovina male film actors
Yugoslav male film actors